Anjiabe Ambony is a town and commune in Madagascar. It belongs to the district of Ambilobe, which is a part of Diana Region. According to 2001 commune census the population of Anjiabe Ambony was 5,285.

Primary and junior level secondary education are available in town. The majority 90% of the population are farmers, while 1% receives their livelihood from raising livestock. The most important crop is sugarcane, while other important products are cotton and rice.  Industry and services provide employment for 5% and 1% of the population, respectively. Additionally fishing employs 3% of the population.

References and notes 

Populated places in Diana Region